The Commonwealth Bank Series was the name of the One Day International cricket tournament in Australia for the 2006–07 season. It was a tri-nation series between Australia, England and New Zealand.

Australia booked a place in the final after just seven matches in the tournament, and having participated in just five, with five games left to play. The other place in the final came down to the last match of the series as New Zealand and England both had won only 2 games; England won this semi-final of sorts.

England won the final series by two games to nil to lift the trophy, making it their first major one-day tournament win since 1997 and their first Australian tri-series win since 20 years previous, when they also won the Ashes.

Fixtures
Matches played in the series were as follows:

Squads

Group stage table

Points system
A win earns 4 points, a tie or no result = 2 points, a bonus = 1 point and a loss = 0 points.

If the team batting first match and restricts its opponents to 80% of its total, it gains a bonus point. If the team batting second wins the match in 40 overs, it gains a bonus point.

A team's run rate will be calculated by reference to the runs scored in an innings divided by the number of overs faced. 

In the event of teams finishing on equal points, the right to play in the final will be determined as follows: 
 The team with the most wins 
 If still equal, the team with the most wins over the other team(s) who are equal on points and have the same number of wins 
 If still equal, the team with the most bonus points 
 If still equal, the team with the highest net run rate

Group stage matches

Match 1: Australia v England, 12 January

England won the toss and elected to bat. Kevin Pietersen was the only England player to get settled, scoring 82. It was debated whether this effected his dismissal getting out caught playing a big shot, slightly after a Glenn McGrath bouncer which injured Pietersen for the rest of the tour. In the end England scored a mediocre total of 242.
The English team's bowling attack couldn't have got to a worse start after Gilchrist and Hayden smashed 16 off the first over. After Hayden and Gilchrist got out, Ponting and Clarke took over both going above 50. Australia cruised to an 8 wicket victory with 5 overs remaining.

Match 2: Australia v New Zealand, 14 January

All of the Australian batsman scored reasonable scores that gave Australia a big first innings total. Shane Bond got a one-day hat trick while cleaning up the tail. New Zealand couldn't chase down Australia, Andrew Symonds named man of the match.

Match 3: England v New Zealand, 16 January

Man of the match Andrew Flintoff scored 72 and hit the winning run with just one ball remaining to get their first win on tour.

Match 4: Australia v England, 19 January

England were bowled out for a low score and got early wickets and slowed the run rate to even up the match. Mike Hussey had a controversial decision being not out after nicking a ball to Nixon. He went on to become the man of the match for his 46 including a slog sweep which went for six.

Match 5: Australia v New Zealand, 21 January

Craig McMillan saved the Kiwis from a low score after they had lost early wickets. New Zealand bowled well early with Clarke and Hussey rescuing the Aussies. This was also Nathan Astle's last match, retiring due to poor form.

Match 6: England v New Zealand, 23 January

Match 7: Australia v England, 26 January

England reached a new low bowled out for 110 in what was regarded as their worst performance on tour.

Match 8: Australia v New Zealand, 28 January

Hayden and Ponting both smashed hundreds to give Australia a huge first innings score. New Zealand did well chasing, falling just short with Oram also getting a century.

Match 9: England v New Zealand, 30 January

Match 10: Australia v England, 2 February

England finally beat Australia with Ed Joyce scoring a 100 as England almost reached 300. Plunkett bowled Gilchrist on the first ball, while Symonds had to retire hurt.

Match 11: Australia v New Zealand, 4 February

Match 12: England v New Zealand, 6 February

Paul Collingwood was back in form getting his first 100 since the Adelaide Test match. The captain Fleming then led from the front scoring a 100 despite controversially running out his partner.

Final series

First match: Australia vs England, 9 February

Second match: Australia vs England, 11 February

English achieved slightly above average score, but it was expected Australia should chase it down. However, rain interrupted Australia's innings several times, and the interruptions, the lost wickets, the adjusted target and slow outfield made the required run rate difficult. England ensured victory with further wickets as Australia tried to progress the score. It was a huge victory for England, who had otherwise had a terrible tour and who at the start of the series were playing poor cricket. The defeat of Australia was a significant blow to the reigning world champions, they also lost their next three matches in New Zealand.

References

External links
 Tournament home at Cricinfo
 Cricket Australia
 England and Wales Cricket Board
 New Zealand Cricket

Ashes
Australian Tri-Series
2006–07 Australian cricket season